Tobi 18 - Coptic Calendar - Tobi 20

The nineteenth day of the Coptic month of Tobi, the fifth month of the Coptic year. On a common year, this day corresponds to January 14, of the Julian Calendar, and January 27, of the Gregorian Calendar. This day falls in the Coptic Season of Shemu, the season of the Harvest.

Commemorations 

 The discovery of the Relics of Saint Abahour, Saint Bisoura, and their mother Saint Ampera

References 

Days of the Coptic calendar